Lobanikha is a rural locality (a village) in Medvedevskoye Rural Settlement, Totemsky  District, Vologda Oblast, Russia. The population was 10 as of 2002.

Geography 
Lobanikha is located 20 km northeast of Totma (the district's administrative centre) by road. Sovinskaya is the nearest rural locality.

References 

Rural localities in Totemsky District